
Ostrołęka County is a unit of territorial administration and local government (powiat) in Masovian Voivodeship, east-central Poland. It came into being on January 1, 1999, as a result of the Polish local government reforms passed in 1998. Its administrative seat is the city of Ostrołęka, although the city is not part of the county (it constitutes a separate city county).

As of 2019 its total population is 88,717, out of which the population of Myszyniec is 3,408 and the rural population is 85,309.

Neighbouring counties
Apart from the city of Ostrołęka, Ostrołęka County is also bordered by Pisz County and Kolno County to the north, Łomża County to the east, Ostrów Mazowiecka County to the south-east, Wyszków County to the south, Maków County to the south-west, Przasnysz County to the west, and Szczytno County to the north-west.

Administrative division
The county is subdivided into 11 gminas (one urban-rural and 10 rural). These are listed in the following table, in descending order of population.

References

 
Land counties of Masovian Voivodeship